Up Swing is a compilation album of phonograph records released by bandleaders Tommy Dorsey, Glenn Miller, Benny Goodman, and Artie Shaw in 1944 as a part of the Victor Musical Smart Set series. The set, a progenitor to greatest hits releases, features some of the most popular Dance Band Era recordings by the four bandleaders.

Reception

Released in the middle of the 1942-44 recording ban, the album reached number four on the August 4, 1945 Billboard Best-Selling Popular Record Albums chart, which would soon become the standard. A February 1944 issue of Billboard Magazine highlighted Miller's disc specifically: "Re-issue of this swell tune is one of eight sides comprising Victor's new album, "Up Swing." A close race, but this disk wins. Miller fans, new and old, should eat it up." However, Swing Magazine's Bob Kennedy preferred Shaw's disk and declared the album "an absolute must for collectors."

Track listing
These reissued songs were featured on a 4-disc, 78 rpm album set, Victor P-146.

Disc 1: (20-1549)

Disc 2: (20-1550)

Disc 3: (20-1551)

Disc 4: (20-1552)

LP track listing
In 1951, RCA Victor reissued the set on 10" LP as RCA Victor LPT-12.

References

RCA Victor compilation albums
Glenn Miller compilation albums
Benny Goodman albums
Artie Shaw albums
1944 albums